Todros ben Meshullam ben David or Todros Todrosi (born 1313) was a Jewish translator from Arles, France who lived in the early fourteenth century. He translated various Arabic works of Muslim authors into Hebrew, including works of Al-Farabi, Avicenna's Kitab al-Najat and multiple works by Averroes.

Citation

References 

14th-century French Jews
People from Arles
1313 births